Fernandez Hospital is a premier speciality Hospital for women and newborns in Hyderabad established in 1948. It has been providing efficient, reliable and personalized health care of a very high professional level for over 60 years.

History
It was founded by Dr. Leslie Fernandez and Dr. Lourdes Fernandez.

Dr. Leslie Fernandez was a multifaceted personality. He was a physician, an administrator, social worker, talented painter and a philanthropist.

Dr. Lourdes Fernandez married him. She started a clinic shortly after marriage with support from her husband  and encouraged by the moral and financial support of her family. Together with her husband she took the clinic into a hospital and path of progression to a modern institution, that consists of 3 hospitals across Hyderabad.

The hospital is noted for its "normal deliveries" as compared to the high cesarean section that happen at most hospitals today. The hospital at Hyderguda caters mainly to "high risk pregnancies".

The hospital is under the care of their daughter Dr. Evita Fernandez and her talented and able team of doctors, since 1985.

External links
 Official website of Fernandez Hospital.
 Dr. Evita Fernandez

Hospital buildings completed in 1948
Hospitals in Hyderabad, India
20th-century architecture in India